Gloucester is a city and the county town of Gloucestershire, United Kingdom. It may also refer to:

Places

Australia
 Gloucester, New South Wales, a town
 Gloucester River, a river near the town
 Gloucester Shire, a former local government area in New South Wales
 Gloucester Tops, a monolithic plateau located adjacent to the Barrington Tops National Park

Canada
 Gloucester County, New Brunswick
 Acadie—Bathurst, New Brunswick (formerly Gloucester), a federal electoral district
 Gloucester, Ontario
 Gloucester Township, Ontario

England
 Gloucestershire, a county
 Gloucester Place, London
 Gloucester Road, London
 Gloucester (UK Parliament constituency)

Hong Kong
 Gloucester Road, Hong Kong

Papua New Guinea
 Gloucester Rural LLG, New Britain
 Cape Gloucester (Papua New Guinea), New Britain

United States
(by state)
 Gloucester, Massachusetts
 Gloucester (Natchez, Mississippi), listed on the National Register of Historic Places
 Gloucester City, New Jersey
 Gloucester Point Grounds, the former baseball grounds for the Philadelphia Athletics
 Gloucester County, New Jersey
 Gloucester Township, New Jersey
 Gloucester County, New York
 Gloucester, North Carolina
 Gloucester County, Virginia
 Gloucester Courthouse, Virginia
 Gloucester Point, Virginia

Boats and ships
 Gloucester 16, an American sailboat design
 Gloucester 19, an American sailboat design
  or Glocester, various ships of Britain's Royal Navy

People with the surname
 John Gloucester (1776–1822), American Presbyterian minister
 Stephen H. Gloucester (1802–1850), an organizer for the Underground Railroad

Titles
 Duke of Gloucester, a title in Peerage of the United Kingdom
 Earl of Gloucester, a title created several times in the Peerage of the United Kingdom

Other uses
 Gloucester (typeface), a version of the Cheltenham display typeface from Monotype
 Gloucester Cathedral, in Gloucester, England
 Gloucester cattle, a breed of dairy and beef cattle
 Gloucester cheese, a British cheese
 Gloucester College, Oxford, a former college in England
 Gloucestershire Old Spots, a breed of pig sometimes referred to as a "gloucester"
 Gloucester Rugby, a professional rugby union team from the English city of the same name

See also
 
 Glocester, Rhode Island, United States
 Gloster (disambiguation)
 Glouster, Ohio, United States
 New Gloucester, Maine, United States